Talicada is an Indomalayan genus of butterflies in the family Lycaenidae.

Species
Talicada nyseus (Guérin-Méneville, 1843) – Red Pierrot
Talicada metana  Riley & Godfrey, 1921 Thailand
Talicada buruana  Holland, 1900 Buru

External links
Funet

Polyommatini
Lycaenidae genera
Taxa named by Frederic Moore